The Radeon X700 (RV410) series replaced the X600 in September 2004. X700 Pro is clocked at 425 MHz core, and produced on a 0.11 micrometre process. RV410 used a layout consisting of 8 pixel pipelines connected to 4 ROPs (similar to GeForce 6600) while maintaining the 6 vertex shaders of X800. The 110 nm process was a cost-cutting process, designed not for high clock speeds but for reducing die size while maintaining high yields. An X700 XT was planned for production, and reviewed by various hardware web sites, but was never released. It was believed that X700 XT set too high of a clock ceiling for ATI to profitably produce. X700 XT was also not adequately competitive with nVidia's impressive GeForce 6600GT. ATI would go on produce a card in the X800 series to compete instead.

Radeon Feature Matrix

Radeon R400 series

AGP (X7xx, X8xx)

 All models include AGP 8x
 All models include DirectX 9.0b and OpenGL 2.0

 1 Pixel shaders : Vertex shaders : Texture mapping units : Render output units

PCI-E (X7xx)

 All models include PCI-E x16
 All models include DirectX 9.0b and OpenGL 2.0

 1 Pixel shaders : Vertex shaders : Texture mapping units : Render output units

See also
 List of AMD graphics processing units
 Free_and_open-source_device_drivers:_graphics#ATI.2FAMD

External links
 techPowerUp! GPU Database

ATI Technologies products
Graphics cards